Dattenfeld (Sieg) station is a through station in the town of Windeck in the German state of North Rhine-Westphalia. The station was opened between 1880 and 1897 on a section of the Sieg Railway, opened by the Cologne-Minden Railway Company (CME) between Eitorf and Wissen on 1 August 1861. It has two platform tracks and is classified by Deutsche Bahn as a category 6 station.

The station is served by Rhine-Ruhr S-Bahn line S12 between Horrem and Au (Sieg) and the S19 on weekdays from Düren to Au (Sieg). The S12 services operate hourly, but the S19 services are less frequent.

Notes

Rhine-Ruhr S-Bahn stations
S12 (Rhine-Ruhr S-Bahn)
Railway stations in Germany opened in 1880
Buildings and structures in Rhein-Sieg-Kreis